The Tennessee Department of Veterans Services (TDVS) is the head of Tennessee's Department of Veterans Affairs, which is responsible for veterans benefits programs within the state. The Commissioner is appointed by the governor of Tennessee and is a member of the governor's Cabinet, which meets at least once per month, or more often to the governor's liking.

The position of Commissioner was first created in 1945, along with the department it heads, but in 1959 the department became a staff division under the governor's office headed by a director. The position of Commissioner was recreated in 1975 by the Tennessee General Assembly. It is analogous to the federal Secretary of Veterans Affairs or the Minister of Veterans Affairs of Canada.

According to the Tennessee State Library and Archives, Louis Ragghianti was the first Commissioner after the Department's reinstatement, from 1975 to 1979, under Governor Ray Blanton. William H. Roden, Jr. was the Commissioner under the administration of Lamar Alexander. William D. "Bill" Manning, appointed in 1987, was the Commissioner under Ned Ray McWherter, and Fred Tucker was the Commissioner of Veterans Services under Don Sundquist. The current Commissioner, under the administration of Bill Haslam, is Many-Bears Grinder.

External links
LexisNexis's archive of Tennessee Code, Title 4
The Tennessee Blue Book's section on the Department (PDF)
An archive of The Middle Tennessee Times mentioning Bill Manning's passing away
The Tennessee Department of Veterans Affairs website in 1999

State agencies of Tennessee
State departments of veterans affairs in the United States